Hosay (originally from Husayn) is a Muslim Indo-Caribbean commemoration that is popularly observed in Trinidad and Tobago, Jamaica, Guyana, and Suriname. They are built and paraded, then ritually taken to the sea on last day of observance, and finally discarded into the water.
The word  derived from the Arabic word  and signifies different cultural meanings depending on the region, time period, occasion, and religion. In Guyana, and Suriname, the festival is called Taziya or in Caribbean Hindustani  in reference to these floats, arguably the most visible and decorative element of this festival.
 
Generally, Hosay lasts for ten days and is observed in accordance with  the Islamic lunar calendar and in line with ten days of Ashura commemorated by Shia Muslims throughout the world. The last four days are the most popular as the first six days are days of fasting, prayer and building of the "Tadjahs" and "Moons".  Although Hosay was traditionally commemorated for Husain and was a Shi'a festival, its celebration in recent times has adopted all types of shades and characters from Sunni Islam and other religions including Hinduism, Christianity, Rastafari, Afro-American religions, and Kejawèn, making the modern event a mixture of different cultures and religions. The event is attended by both Muslims and non-Muslims, depicting an environment of mutual respect and tolerance. A unique design of  can be found during the Hosay celebrations in Cedros, a coastal village situated in the southwestern end of Trinidad, that are built in an exclusive style that is not found anywhere else in the world, in terms of the art and style of construction.  In nineteenth-century Trinidad newspapers as well as government reports derogatorily called Hosay the "Coolie Carnival."

Origins
The Hosay or Husay (derived from Husayn or Hussein)  commemoration is a Caribbean manifestation of the Shia Muslim Remembrance of Muharram in Trinidad and Tobago and Jamaica. The name Hosay comes from "Husayn" who was assassinated by Yazid in Karbala. This martyrdom is commemorated in the festival.  In Trinidad and Tobago it is primarily celebrated in Saint James, in northwestern Trinidad and in Cedros in southwestern Trinidad.  Recently it has been revived elsewhere. In Jamaica it is celebrated throughout the island. In the past, every plantation in each parish celebrated Hosay. Today it has been called an Indian carnival and is perhaps most well known in Clarendon where it is celebrated each August. People of all religions attend the event.

In the 1850s, very elaborately decorated models of mosques made of paper and tinsel called  were carried through the streets to the accompaniment of constant drumming. Small fires were lit in the gutters beside the streets over which the drumskins were heated to tighten the skins of the tassa drums. Mock stick fights celebrate the martyrdom of Husayn ibn Ali. The festival lasts three days ending with the throwing of the  into the sea at sunset on the third day. Although Hosay is a religious event for Shias, all of Trinidad's religious and ethnic communities participate in it, and it has become accepted as part of the national culture.

The Remembrance of Muharram was continued to the Caribbean by Muslim Indian indentured labourers and other migrant laborers from India. The observance of Hosay in Trinidad is traced back to 1854. The celebrations encouraged social interactions and were a rare opportunity to cross color lines where those of Indian origin could mingle with those of African, Amerindian, Chinese or other backgrounds.

Suppression
In the 1880s the British colonial authorities became increasingly concerned about public gatherings, and in 1884 issued an ordinance to prevent the public Hosay commemorations. Thousands of workers, who had spent the year building their  joined a Hindu named Sookhoo, in petitioning the government to allow the festival per their agreement with the Governor, who was visiting London during this episode. The first estate that took its  onto the street had earned that right over the past months, and in some towns, Hosay went ahead. In Port-of-Spain (St. James) the police did not interfere, but in Mon Repos, San Fernando, on Thursday, October 30, 1884, buckshot was fired into the crowds of women, children and men. After shots were fired by the police to disperse the procession, 22 "Indians" were killed immediately. Later, 120 were found with injuries, some of whom had run into the cane fields to hide during the police attack. That day is commonly referred to in Trinidad history as the Muhurram Massacre by Indians and as the Hosay Riots in British and colonial records.

See also

 Culture of Trinidad and Tobago
 Islam in Trinidad and Tobago
 Islam in Guyana
 Islam in Suriname
 Islam in Jamaica
 Mourning of Muharram
 Tabuik
 Rawda Khwani

References

Footnotes
 Mendes, John. 1986. Cote ce Cote la: Trinidad & Tobago Dictionary. Arima, Trinidad.

External links
 
 Hosay
 Hosay Trinidad

Religious festivals in Trinidad and Tobago
Mourning of Muharram
Religion in Trinidad and Tobago
Religious festivals in Jamaica
Recurring events established in 1854
Indo-Caribbean religion
1854 establishments in the British Empire
Islam in the Caribbean